Saussure's shrew (Sorex saussurei) is a species of mammal in the family Soricidae, that is found in Mexico. There is also a disjointed population of shrews in Guatemala that is provisionally assigned to this species, but may represent a distinct species.

References

Sorex
Mammals of Central America
Mammals of Mexico
Taxonomy articles created by Polbot
Mammals described in 1892